Iraq competed at the 1960 Summer Olympics in Rome, Italy. 21 competitors, all men, took part in 23 events in 5 sports. Abdul Wahid Aziz won the nation's only Olympic medal.

Medalists

Bronze
Abdul Wahid Aziz — weightlifting, men's lightweight

Athletics

Boxing

Cycling

Two cyclists represented Iraq in 1960.

Individual road race
 Mahmood Munim
 Hamid Oraibi

Weightlifting

Wrestling

References

External links
Official Olympic Reports
International Olympic Committee results database

Nations at the 1960 Summer Olympics
1960
1960 in Iraqi sport